Barış Hersek (born 26 March 1988) is a Turkish professional basketball who last played for Lokman Hekim Fethiye Belediyespor of the Turkish Basketbol Süper Ligi. He plays at the power forward position.

Professional career
Hersek started his pro career with Perteniyal, in the Turkish 2nd Division in the 2005–06 season. In 2006, he moved to the Turkish club Anadolu Efes. In 2008, he joined the Turkish club Darüşşafaka, and in 2009, he moved to the Turkish club Banvit

He joined Antalya BB in 2010, and moved to Beşiktaş in 2011. He moved to Karşıyaka in 2013.

He signed with Fenerbahçe in 2015. He re-signed with the Turkish club for another two years on 23 June 2017. In 2017–18 EuroLeague, Fenerbahçe made it to the 2018 EuroLeague Final Four, its fourth consecutive Final Four appearance. Eventually, they lost to Real Madrid with 80–85 in the final game. On 10 July 2019 Hersek and Fenerbahçe officially parted ways.

On 6 October 2020 he signed with Lokman Hekim Fethiye Belediyespor of the Turkish Basketbol Süper Ligi.

National team career
Hersek won the bronze medal with the Turkish national team at the 2009 Mediterranean Games in Pescara. Hersek also played in the Turkish national team which became the champion at the 2013 Mediterranean Games.

He also played with the senior Turkish national basketball team at the EuroBasket 2009, the 2014 FIBA Basketball World Cup, and the EuroBasket 2015.

References

External links
 Barış Hersek at eurobasket.com
 Barış Hersek at euroleague.net
 Barış Hersek at tblstat.net

1988 births
Living people
2014 FIBA Basketball World Cup players
Anadolu Efes S.K. players
Antalya Büyükşehir Belediyesi players
Bandırma B.İ.K. players
Beşiktaş men's basketball players
Competitors at the 2009 Mediterranean Games
Competitors at the 2013 Mediterranean Games
Darüşşafaka Basketbol players
Fenerbahçe men's basketball players
Fethiye Belediyespor players
Karşıyaka basketball players
Mediterranean Games bronze medalists for Turkey
Mediterranean Games gold medalists for Turkey
Mediterranean Games medalists in basketball
People from Kırklareli
Pertevniyal S.K. players
Power forwards (basketball)
Turkish men's basketball players